The Newcastle upon Tyne Improved Industrial Dwellings Company was set up by James Hall of Hall Brothers Steamship Company, Tynemouth, after visiting Sir Sydney Waterlow's establishment in London. A model dwelling company, it built 108 flats at Garth Heads between 1869 and 1878; the chairman, directors and shareholders were mostly prominent local businessmen.  The company was wound up in 1968 and the buildings at Garth Heads are currently used for private student accommodation.

References 

Model dwellings